Major Christopher York (27 July 1909 – 13 March 1999) was a British Conservative politician.

York was the eldest son of Captain Edward York and his wife, Violet Helen née Milner, daughter of Sir Frederick Milner, 7th Baronet. He was Member of Parliament (MP) for Ripon from 1939 to 1950, and for Harrogate from 1950 until his resignation in 1954.

In 1966 he served as High Sheriff of Yorkshire.

His daughter Rosemary Caroline (1934–2007) married Sir Nicholas Nuttall in 1960 and was the mother of the racing driver Harry Nuttall (born 1963) and of Tamara Nuttall (1967–1997).

Notes

Sources

External links 
 

1909 births
1999 deaths
Conservative Party (UK) MPs for English constituencies
UK MPs 1935–1945
UK MPs 1945–1950
High Sheriffs of Yorkshire